Palakkad is a city in Kerala, India. It may also refer to:
 Palakkad district, a district in Kerala
 Palakkad (Lok Sabha constituency), a Lok Sabha constituency of India
 Palakkad (State Assembly Constituency), a state assembly constituency of Kerala